Tab, TAB, tabs, or TABS may refer to:

Places
 Tab, Hungary, a town
 Tab District, Hungary, whose seat is Tab
 Tab, Indiana, United States, an unincorporated community
 Arthur Napoleon Raymond Robinson International Airport, Tobago, IATA code TAB
 Tame Bridge Parkway railway station, station code TAB

People
 Tab (given name)
 DJ Tab (born 1987), American hip hop DJ, record producer, and entrepreneur
 Mohammad Aram Tab (born 1985), Iranian footballer

Arts, entertainment, and media

Music
 Tab (album), by US band Monster Magnet
 Tab or tablature, fingering-based musical notation, esp. for fretted instruments (e.g., guitars)
 Trey Anastasio (band), an unnamed band, 1999–2004
 Trey Anastasio Band, formerly 70 Volt Parade, 2006
 Dead Boots, a musical group originally known as "TAB the Band"

Publishing formats
 Tab, a comic strip format
 Tab, a tabloid (newspaper format)

Other uses in arts, entertainment, and media
 Tâb, a board game
 Tab Communications, a newspaper publisher
 Tabs (stage), a theatre curtain at front of stage
 Totally Accurate Battle Simulator (TABS), a battle simulation video game
 The Tab, a youth news site published by Tab Media Ltd.
 Tab, a character from Jet Set Radio

Aviation
 Servo tab, for moving an airplane's control surface with a small input force
 Trim tab, for adjusting the hands-free position of an airplane's control surface

Brands and enterprises
 Tab (drink), a diet cola soft drink brand
 Samsung Galaxy Tab, a tablet computer
 Technical advisory board
 Totalisator Agency Board, in Australia and New Zealand
  Transportes Aéreos Bolivianos, a cargo airline
 Travis Association for the Blind

Computing and technology
 Tab (interface), a visual marker in a computer application
 .tab, a file-name extension for tab-separated values
 IE Tab, an extension for some web browsers
 MapInfo TAB format, a geospatial vector data format
 Tab key (↹), on a keyboard
 Tab character, a whitespace character inserted by the tab key

Other uses 
 Tab (archery), a small protective covering for the fingers
 Tab (cuneiform), a common use sign in the Amarna letters and the Epic of Gilgamesh
 Tab (debating), a modified form of Swiss tournament
 Tab, a Cantabrigian person
 TAB or Tab, the abbreviation in medicine and pharmacy for a medication given in tablet form
 Tab, an indicator on a file folder

 Tab, a loaded march in the British Army
  or Tabula, location of hand relative to rest of body, as a component of a sign-language sign
 Beverage can tab, a built-in miniature lever for unsealing
 Tab stop, where typewriter carriage movement is halted by an adjustable end stop
 Tabs of the United States Army, which denote skills
 TAB (armoured personnel carrier), a Romanian amphibious vehicle
 Tab character, abbreviated as TAB or Tab, in computing
 Tactical Advance to Battle, a British Army term for a loaded march
 Tape-automated bonding, in electronics
 Testing, adjusting, balancing, of HVAC systems
 Treehouse attachment bolt
 A restaurant bill, shortening of "tabulation"

See also 
 Tabb (disambiguation)
 Tablet (disambiguation)
 Pull tab (disambiguation)